Frank J. Szabo (born September 16, 1952) is a Hungarian-American trumpeter and Jazz artist.

Szabo was born in Budapest but fled with his family to the United States after the Hungarian Revolution of 1956 that displaced many. 

Career

After his family settled in Los Angeles, he studied trumpet with Tom Scott from age ten. He was a member of Harry James's band in 1970-1971 and toured with Ray Charles worldwide in 1971. He was active as a studio musician from the 1970s into the 2000s, playing for film soundtracks, for television, and for record labels. 

Achievements

As a jazz musician, he toured with Count Basie in 1975 and again in 1983, and also worked with Louie Bellson, the Capp-Pierce Juggernaut, Harry Edison, Teddy Edwards, Gene Harris, Woody Herman, Bill Holman, Chuck Mangione, Don Menza, Grover Mitchell, Roger Neumann, Buddy Rich, Charlie Shoemake, Sarah Vaughan, and Gerald Wilson.

Discography

With Teddy Edwards
Blue Saxophone (Verve/Gitanes, 1992 [1993])
 Unforgettable With Love Natalie Cole

References
"Frank Szabo", The New Grove Dictionary of Jazz. 2nd edition, 2004, ed. Barry Kernfeld.

American jazz trumpeters
American male trumpeters
Hungarian emigrants to the United States
Musicians from Los Angeles
Jazz musicians from California
American male jazz musicians
The Capp-Pierce Juggernaut members